Nawab (Balochi, Pashto: نواب; ;
;
;
Punjabi : ਨਵਾਬ;
Persian,
Punjabi ,
Sindhi,
Urdu), also spelled Nawaab, Navaab, Navab, Nowab, Nabob, Nawaabshah, Nawabshah or Nobab, is a Royal title indicating a sovereign ruler, often of a South Asian state, in many ways comparable to the western title of Prince. The relationship of a Nawab to the Emperor of India has been compared to that of the Kings of Saxony to the German Emperor. In earlier times the title was ratified and bestowed by the reigning Mughal emperor to semi-autonomous Muslim rulers of subdivisions or princely states in the Indian subcontinent loyal to the Mughal Empire, for example the Nawabs of Bengal. The title is common among Muslim rulers of South Asia as an equivalent to the title Maharaja. 

"Nawab" usually refers to males and literally means Viceroy; the female equivalent is "Begum" or "Nawab Begum". The primary duty of a Nawab was to uphold the sovereignty of the Mughal emperor along with the administration of a certain province.

The title of "nawabi" was also awarded as a personal distinction by the paramount power, similar to a British peerage, to persons and families who ruled a princely state for various services to the government of British India. In some cases, the titles were also accompanied by jagir grants, either in cash revenues and allowances or land-holdings. During the British Raj, some of the chiefs, or sardars, of large or important tribes were also given the title, in addition to traditional titles already held by virtue of chieftainship.

The term "Zamindari" was originally used for the subahdar (provincial governor) or viceroy of a subah (province) or regions of the Mughal empire.

History

Nawab is a Hindustani term, used in Urdu, Hindi, Bengali, Pashto and many other North-Indian languages, borrowed via Persian from the Arabic honorific plural of naib, or "deputy." In some areas, especially Bengal, the term is pronounced nobab. This later variation has also entered English and other foreign languages as nabob.

The term "Nawaab" is often used to refer to any Muslim ruler in north or south India while the term "nizam" is preferred for a senior official—it literally means "governor of region". The Nizam of Hyderabad had several nawabs under him: Nawabs of Cuddapah, Sira, Rajahmundry, Kurnool, Chicacole, et al. "Nizam" was his personal title, awarded by the Mughal Government and based on the term "Nazim" as meaning "senior officer". "Nazim" is still used for a district collector in many parts of India. The term "nawab" is still technically imprecise, as the title was also awarded to Hindus and Sikhs, as well, and large zamindars and not necessarily to all Muslim rulers. With the decline of that empire, the title, and the powers that went with it, became hereditary in the ruling families in the various provinces.

Under later British rule, nawabs continued to rule various princely states of Amb, Bahawalpur, Balasinor, Baoni, Banganapalle, Bhopal, Cambay, Jaora, Junagadh, Kurnool (the main city of Deccan), Kurwai, Mamdot, Multan, Palanpur, Pataudi, Radhanpur, Rampur, Malerkotla, Sachin, and Tonk. Other former rulers bearing the title, such as the nawabs of Bengal and Awadh, had been deprived by the British or others by the time the Mughal dynasty finally ended in 1857.
 
Some princes became Nawab by promotion, e.g. the ruler of Palanpur was "diwan" until 1910, then "nawab sahib". Other nawabs were promoted are restyled to another princely style, or to and back, e.g. in Rajgarh a single rawat (rajah) went by nawab. 

The style for a nawab's queen is begum. Most of the nawab dynasties were male primogenitures, although several ruling Begums of Bhopal were a notable exception.

Before the incorporation of the Subcontinent into the British Empire, nawabs ruled the kingdoms of Awadh (or Oudh, encouraged by the British to shed the Mughal suzerainty and assume the imperial style of Badshah), Bengal, Arcot and Bhopal.

Ruling nawab families

Families ruling when acceding to India

 Nawab of Akbarpur - Asmatara Farida Begum
 Nawab Mir Osman Ali Khan Bahadur, the 7th Nizam of Hyderabad
 Nawab of Ashwath
 Nawab Babi of Balasinor
 Nawab of Banganapalle, previously Masulipatam
 Nawab of Baoni
 Nawab of Lucknow, Late Nawab B.B Agnihotri
 Nawab of Basai, Nawab Khwaja Muhammad Khan
 Nawab of Berar styled Mirza of Berar (under the Nizam of Hyderabad)
 Nawab of Bhikampur and Datawali (Aligarh)
 Nawab of Bhopal (female rulers were known as Nawab Begum of Bhopal)
 Nawabs of Cambay 
 the former Nawabs of the Carnatic, restyled Princes of Arcot
 Nawab of Dujana
 Nawab of Farrukhabad
 Nawab of Jaora
 Nawab Sahib of Junagadh
 Nawab of Maler Kotla
 Nawab of Muhammadgar
 Nawab Sahib of Palanpur (till 1910 styled Diwan)
Nawab of Awadh
 Nawab of Pathari
 Nawab of Radhanpur
 Nawab of Rampur
 Nawab of Sachin
 Nawab of Sardhana
 Nawab of Tonk, India
 Nawab of Ghazipur

Former dynasties of princely states in India abolished before independence
 Nawab of Kurwai
 Nawab of Pataudi
 Nawab of Savanur
 Nawab of Mamdot
 Nawab of Tarakote State
 Nawab of Farukhnagar
 Nawab of Jhajjar
 Nawab of Surat

Families ruling when acceding to Pakistan 

 Nawab of Kalabagh
 Nawab of Amb
 Nawab of Bahawalpur
 Nawab of Dir
 Nawab Sahib of Junagadh
 Nawab of Kharan
 Nawab of Maler Kotla
 Nawab of Jogezai
 Nawab of Bugti
 Nawab of Marri (tribe)

Families ruling when acceding to Bangladesh 

 Nawab of Bengal
 Nawab of Dhaka
 Nawab of Longla (Sylhet)

Former dynasties which became political pensioners
 Padshah-i-Oudh, formerly Nawab Wazir of Awadh,
 also imperial Wazir of all Mughal India, both hereditary
 Nawabs of Bengal, as Nawabs of Murshidabad
 Nawab of Marauli
 Nawab of Patna
 Nawab of Surat
 Nawab of Longla (Sylhet)

Rohilla Confederation

All of these states were at some point under the authority of the Nawab of Rohilkhand, later made the Nawab of Rampur. Most of these states were annexed at the close of the First Rohilla War.
 Nawab of Badaun 
 Nawab of Moradabad 
 Nawab of Bareilly 
 Nawab of Najibabad 
 Nawab of Philibit 
 Nawab of Farrukhabad 
 Nawab of Bisollee

Miscellaneous nawabs

Personal nawabs 

The title nawab was also awarded as a personal distinction by the paramount power, similarly to a British peerage, to persons and families who never ruled a princely state. For the Muslim elite various Mughal-type titles were introduced, including nawab. Among the noted British creations of this type were Nawab Hashim Ali Khan (1858–1940), Nawab Khwaja Abdul Ghani (1813–1896), Nawab Abdul Latif (1828–1893), Nawab Faizunnesa Choudhurani (1834–1904), Nawab Ali Chowdhury (1863–1929), Nawaab Syed Shamsul Huda (1862–1922), Nawab Sirajul Islam (1848–1923), Nawab Alam yar jung Bahadur, M.A, Madras, B.A., B.C.L., Barr-At-Law (1890–1974). There also were the Nawabs of Dhanbari, Nawabs of Ratanpur, Nawabs of Baroda and such others.

Nawab as a court rank

Nawab was also the rank title—again not an office—of a much lower class of Muslim nobles—in fact retainers—at the court of the Nizam of Hyderabad and Berar State, ranking only above Khan Bahadur and Khan, but under (in ascending order) Jang, Daula, Mulk, Umara and Jah; the equivalent for Hindu courtiers was Raja Bahadur.

Derived titles

Nawabzada

This style, adding the Persian suffix -zada which means son (or other male descendants; see other cases in prince), etymologically fits a nawab’s sons, but in actual practice various dynasties established other customs.

For example, in Bahawalpur only the nawbab's heir apparent used nawabzada before his personal name, then Khan Abassi, finally Wali Ahad Bahadur (an enhancement of Wali Ehed), while the other sons of the ruling nawab used the style sahibzada before the personal name and only Khan Abassi behind. "Nawabzadi" implies daughters of the reigning nawbab.

Elsewhere, there were rulers who were not styled nawbab yet awarded a title nawabzada to others.

Naib (Ottoman, Iranian, Arabic title)

The word naib has been historically used to refer to any suzerain leader, feudatory, or regent in some parts of the Ottoman Empire, successive early modern Persianate kingdoms (Safavids, etc.), and in the eastern Caucasus (e.g. during Caucasian Imamate). In the Sultanate of Morocco, the Naib was the Sultan's emissary to the foreign legations in Tangier between 1848 and 1923, when the creation of the Tangier International Zone led to its replacement by the office of the Mendoub. 

Today, the word is used to refer to directly elected legislators in lower houses of parliament in many Arabic-speaking areas to contrast them against officers of upper houses (or Shura). The term Majlis al-Nuwwab (literally council of deputies) has been adopted as the name of several legislative lower houses and unicameral legislatures.

"Naib" has also been used in the Malay language (especially of the Malaysian variant) to translate the component of "deputy" or "vice" in certain titles (e.g "Vice President" - Naib Presiden) aside from timbalan and wakil (latter predominant in the Indonesian variant).

"Nabob", derived colloquial term

In colloquial usage in English (since 1612), adopted in other Western languages, the transliteration "nabob" refers to commoners: a merchant-leader of high social status and wealth. "Nabob" derives from the Bengali pronunciation of "nawab":  nôbab.

During the 18th century in particular, it was widely used as a disparaging term for British merchants or administrators who, having made a fortune in India, returned to Britain and aspired to be recognised as having the higher social status that their new wealth would enable them to maintain. Jos Sedley in Thackeray's Vanity Fair is probably the best known example in fiction.

From this specific usage it came to be sometimes used for ostentatiously rich businesspeople in general.

"Nabob" can also be used metaphorically for people who have a grandiose sense of their own importance, as in the famous alliterative dismissal of the news media as "nattering nabobs of negativism" in a speech that was delivered by Nixon's vice president Spiro Agnew and written by William Safire.

Gallery

Indian states formerly ruled by Nawabs

Amb (Tanoli)
Arcot
Awadh
Bahawalpur
Balasinor
Banganapalle
Baoni
Bengal
Berar (nominally under Nizam of Hyderabad)
Bhopal
Cambay
Dir
Farrukhabad (Uttar Pradesh, India)
Farrukhnagar
Hyderabad
Jaora
Junagadh
Ghazipur
Tarakote State
Kurwai
Kalabagh
Malerkotla
Mamdot
Manavadar
Warcha
Palanpur (Gujarat, India)
Pataudi
Radhanpur
Rampur
Sachin
Tonk

See also
 Subedar
 Mughal Empire

References

Further reading
 
 
Etymology OnLine

 
Gubernatorial titles
Heads of state
Noble titles
Royal titles
Titles in Bangladesh
Titles in India
Titles in Pakistan
Titles of national or ethnic leadership